Dodona (minor planet designation: 382 Dodona) is a large Main belt asteroid that was discovered by the French astronomer Auguste Charlois on 29 January 1894 in Nice. It is classified as an M-type asteroid.

Measurements of the thermal inertia of 115 Thyra give an estimated range of 15–150 J m−2 K−1 s−1/2, compared to 50 for lunar regolith and 400 for coarse sand in an atmosphere.

References

External links
 
 

Background asteroids
Dodona
Dodona
M-type asteroids (Tholen)
18940129